Wezzie Mvula is a Malawian footballer who plays as a midfielder for  the Malawi women's national team.

References

Living people
Malawian women's footballers
Women's association football midfielders
Malawi women's international footballers
Year of birth missing (living people)